Admiral Edward Granville George Howard, 1st Baron Lanerton (23 December 1809 – 8 October 1880), was a British naval commander and politician.

Background
Howard was the fourth son of George Howard, 6th Earl of Carlisle, and his wife Lady Georgiana Dorothy, daughter of William Cavendish, 5th Duke of Devonshire. George Howard, 7th Earl of Carlisle, was his elder brother.

Naval and political career
He served in the Royal Navy and achieved the rank of admiral in 1870, and also sat as Whig Member of Parliament for Morpeth from 1833 to 1837 and from 1840 to 1852. In 1874 he was raised to the peerage as Baron Lanerton, of Lanerton in the County of Cumberland.

Personal life
Lord Lanerton married Diana, daughter of the Hon. George Ponsonby, in 1842. The marriage was childless. He died in October 1880, aged 70, when the barony became extinct. Lady Lanerton died in 1893.

See also

References

External links 
 

1809 births
1880 deaths
Younger sons of earls
Edward Howard
Members of the Parliament of the United Kingdom for Morpeth
Barons in the Peerage of the United Kingdom
UK MPs 1832–1835
UK MPs 1835–1837
UK MPs 1847–1852
UK MPs who were granted peerages
Whig (British political party) MPs for English constituencies
Peers of the United Kingdom created by Queen Victoria